Robinson Dvoranen (born ) is a Brazilian volleyball player.

Sporting achievements
 National championships
 2002/2003  Brazilian Championship, with ECUS
 2006/2007  Brazilian Championship, with Sport Club Ulbra
 2007/2008  Brazilian Championship, with Sport Club Ulbra
 2011/2012  Brazilian Championship, with Vôlei Futuro
 2012/2013  Romanian Championship, with Remat Zalău

Individually
 2016/2017: Brazilian Championship - The Best Receiver

References

External links
Player profile at WorldofVolley.com
Player profile at legavolley.it
Player profile at volleybox.net
PlusLiga player profile

1983 births
Living people
Brazilian men's volleyball players
Sporting CP volleyball players
Cuprum Lubin players
Brazilian expatriate sportspeople in Italy
Brazilian expatriate sportspeople in Romania
Brazilian expatriate sportspeople in Indonesia
Brazilian expatriate sportspeople in Iran
Brazilian expatriate sportspeople in Poland
People from Maringá
Sportspeople from Paraná (state)